"Lunar Paraphrase" is a poem from the second (1931) edition of
Wallace Stevens's first book of poetry,
Harmonium. One of Stevens's
"war poems" from "Lettres d'un Soldat" (1918), it is in the public
domain.

The poem makes use of a late autumn night to express a mood. It appropriates Christian images in a manner that is consistent with a naturalism that disclaims religious belief. (See Sunday Morning for another expression of that outlook.) Stevens's post-Christian sensibility channels emotions into nature rather than God and associated religious figures like Jesus and Mary. In this case, pathos and pity are channeled into autumn and the moon. Vendler has proposed that the weather is the only phenomenon to which Stevens was passionately attached, and a poem like "Lunar Paraphrase" shows how that might be true, when the weather is understood as representing nature as a focus for emotions that otherwise might have been given religious expression. Stevens's poetic naturalism was a significant achievement, from which he may or may not have retreated at the end of his life, depending on what one makes of the evidence of a deathbed conversion to Catholicism.

The movement of the moon's old light may be compared to the light in Tattoo, which crawls over the water like a spider.

Notes

References 
Stevens, H. Letters of Wallace Stevens. 1966: Alfred A. Knopf

1917 poems
1931 poems
American poems
Poetry by Wallace Stevens